Francesco Tomei (born 19 May 1985 in Lucca) is an Italian cyclist. He rode in the 2009 Vuelta a España.

Palmares
2005
2nd U23 National Time Trial Championships
2006
2nd U23 National Time Trial Championships

References

1985 births
Living people
Italian male cyclists
Sportspeople from Lucca
Cyclists from Tuscany